Shara (translit. Sharasōju), is a 2003 Japanese drama film directed by Naomi Kawase. It was entered into the 2003 Cannes Film Festival.

Cast
 Kōhei Fukunaga as Shun
 Yuka Hyōdō as Yu
 Naomi Kawase as Reiko
 Katsuhisa Namase as Taku
 Kanako Higuchi as Shouko

References

External links

2003 films
2003 drama films
Japanese drama films
2000s Japanese-language films
Films directed by Naomi Kawase
2000s Japanese films